Khawaja Bains is a village in Batala in Gurdaspur district of Punjab State, India. The village is administrated by Sarpanch, an elected representative of the village.

Demography 
In 2011, the village had 45 houses and a population of 251 (155  males and 96 females). According to the report published by Census India in 2011, the population included 21 from Scheduled Caste and the village had no Schedule Tribe.

See also
List of villages in India

References

External links 
 Tourism of Punjab
 Census of Punjab

Villages in Gurdaspur district